The 2019 United States Open Championship was the 119th U.S. Open, played from   at Pebble Beach Golf Links in Pebble Beach, California. It was the seventh major and sixth U.S. Open at Pebble Beach, which last hosted U.S. Opens in 2000 and 2010, won by Tiger Woods and Graeme McDowell, respectively.

Gary Woodland won his first major title by three strokes over world number one Brooks Koepka. Ranked 25th coming into the tournament, and having never finished in the top 20 in the U.S. Open previously, he was generally seen as a surprise victor. Koepka had won four of the last nine majors, and was attempting to become the first player to win three straight U.S. Opens since 1905.

Woodland shot 68 in the first round, and 65 in the second, to lead by two strokes after 36 holes. He shot 69 in the third round, to have a single-stroke lead over Justin Rose going into the final day. After shooting a 69 in the final round, he converted a 54-hole lead into a victory for the first time in eight attempts in stroke-play events. His 72-hole winning score, a 13-under-par 271, was the lowest relative to par since 2011 and included a stretch of 34 holes without a bogey. Woodland led the field in scrambling, having begun the week ranked 169th in that category.

The previous winner of the U.S. Open at Pebble Beach, Graeme McDowell, finished tied for 16th with a 3-under-par 281. Tiger Woods was tied 58th after the first round, and began his final round by bogeying four of his first six holes, but rallied on the back nine to finish tied for 21st with a 2-under-par 282. Justin Rose entered the final round one shot back of Woodland but made three bogeys on his final seven holes to finish tied for 3rd. On his 49th birthday, six-time U.S. Open runner-up, Phil Mickelson finished with a 4-over-par 288, having won the AT&T Pebble Beach Pro-Am earlier in the year at Pebble Beach.

79 players made the cut, including four amateurs. The leading amateur was Norwegian Viktor Hovland, who had qualified by winning the 2018 U.S. Amateur, which was also held at Pebble Beach. He finished tied for 12th at 4-under-par, to become first low amateur at the Masters and U.S. Open in the same season since Matt Kuchar in 1998.

The U.S. Open traditionally has a winning score around par, but a joint record 31 players finished under par for the tournament. This was partly attributed by the media to the soft conditions resulting from a marine layer, and relatively low wind speeds for a links-style course.

Venue

Course layout

Pebble Beach hosted the AT&T Pebble Beach Pro-Am in February of the same year. The changes made to the course since that event include reducing par from 72 to 71, cutting the greens from .125" to .110", and growing the rough from 2" to between 3-5".

Previous course lengths for major championships
  - par 71, 2010 U.S. Open
  - par 71, 2000 U.S. Open
  - par 72, 1992 U.S. Open
  - par 72, 1982 U.S. Open
  - par 72, 1977 PGA Championship
  - par 72, 1972 U.S. Open
Prior to 2000, the 2nd hole was played as a par 5.

2019 yardages by round

 Scoring average: 72.352
 by round: 72.685, 72.571, 72.430, 71.190
 Most difficult holes in relation to par: 10, 8 and 9, 9, 9

Source:

Field
About half the field consisted of players who are exempt from qualifying for the U.S. Open. Each player is classified according to the first category in which he qualified, and other categories are shown in parentheses.

1. Winners of the U.S. Open Championship during the last ten years
Lucas Glover, Dustin Johnson (9,11,12,13,14), Martin Kaymer, Brooks Koepka (7,9,11,12,13,14), Graeme McDowell, Rory McIlroy (6,7,8,9,12,13,14), Justin Rose (11,12,13,14), Webb Simpson (8,11,12,13,14), Jordan Spieth (5,6,13,14)

2. Winners of the 2018 U.S. Amateur, U.S. Junior Amateur, and U.S. Mid-Amateur, and runner-up of the 2018 U.S. Amateur
Devon Bling (a), Viktor Hovland (a), Kevin O'Connell (a), Michael Thorbjornsen (a)

3. Winner of the 2018 Amateur Championship
Jovan Rebula (a)

4. Winner of the 2018 Mark H. McCormack Medal (men's World Amateur Golf Ranking)
Braden Thornberry forfeited his exemption by turning professional in December 2018.

5. Winners of the Masters Tournament during the last five years
Sergio García (13,14), Patrick Reed (11,12,13,14), Danny Willett, Tiger Woods (9,12,13,14)

6. Winners of The Open Championship during the last five years
Zach Johnson, Francesco Molinari (9,12,13,14), Henrik Stenson (11,13,14)

7. Winners of the PGA Championship during the last five years
Jason Day (12,13,14), Justin Thomas (12,13,14), Jimmy Walker

8. Winners of The Players Championship during the last three years
Kim Si-woo (13,14)

9. Winners of multiple PGA Tour events that award a full-point allocation for the FedEx Cup, between the 2018 U.S. Open and the 2019 U.S. Open
Bryson DeChambeau (12,13,14), Matt Kuchar (13,14), Kevin Na (12,13,14), Xander Schauffele (11,12,13,14)

10. Winner of the 2018 U.S. Senior Open Championship
David Toms

11. The 10 lowest scorers and anyone tying for 10th place at the 2018 U.S. Open Championship
Daniel Berger, Tony Finau (12,13,14), Tommy Fleetwood (12,13,14), Tyrrell Hatton (13,14)

12. Players who qualified for the season-ending 2018 Tour Championship
Keegan Bradley (13,14), Patrick Cantlay (13,14), Paul Casey (13,14), Rickie Fowler (13,14), Billy Horschel (13,14), Patton Kizzire, Marc Leishman (13,14), Hideki Matsuyama (13,14), Phil Mickelson (13,14), Jon Rahm (13,14), Cameron Smith (13,14), Kyle Stanley (13,14), Bubba Watson (13,14), Aaron Wise, Gary Woodland (13,14)

13. The top 60 point leaders and ties as of May 20, 2019 in the Official World Golf Ranking
An Byeong-hun (14), Abraham Ancer, Kiradech Aphibarnrat (14), Lucas Bjerregaard (14), Rafa Cabrera-Bello (14), Matt Fitzpatrick (14), Jim Furyk (14), Branden Grace (14), Justin Harding (14), J. B. Holmes (14), Charles Howell III (14), Kevin Kisner (14), Li Haotong (14), Luke List, Shane Lowry (14), Keith Mitchell (14), Alex Norén (14), Thorbjørn Olesen (14), Louis Oosthuizen (14), Pan Cheng-tsung (14), Ian Poulter (14), Chez Reavie, Adam Scott (14), Brandt Snedeker (14), Matt Wallace (14)

Eddie Pepperell (14) did not play due to a back injury.

14. The top 60 point leaders and ties as of June 10, 2019 in the Official World Golf Ranking
Emiliano Grillo, Scott Piercy, Andrew Putnam

15. Special exemptions given by the USGA
Ernie Els

The remaining contestants earned their places through sectional qualifiers.  Each site has n spots allocated amongst m players denoted (n/m).
 Milton, Ontario, Canada (4/37): Tom Hoge, Nate Lashley, Alex Prugh, Sepp Straka
 Surrey, England (14/110): Adri Arnaus, Merrick Bremner, Dean Burmester, Rhys Enoch, Marcus Fraser, Daniel Hillier (a), Sam Horsfield, Marcus Kinhult, Renato Paratore, Matthieu Pavon, Thomas Pieters, Lee Slattery, Clément Sordet, Justin Walters
 Mie Prefecture, Japan (3/33): Mikumu Horikawa, Kodai Ichihara, Shugo Imahira
 United States
 Newport Beach, California (5/99): Stewart Hagestad (a), Andreas Halvorsen (L), Richard H. Lee (L), Hayden Shieh (L), Yu Chun-an (a)
 Bowling Green, Florida (3/56): Luis Gagne, Mito Pereira (L), Callum Tarren
 Ball Ground, Georgia (4/67): Roberto Castro, Chandler Eaton (a,L), Noah Norton (a,L), Ollie Schniederjans
 Rockville, Maryland (4/63): Connor Arendell (L), Joseph Bramlett, Billy Hurley III, Ryan Sullivan (L)
 Purchase, New York (4/73): Rob Oppenheim, Matt Parziale (a), Andy Pope, Cameron Young (a)
 Columbus, Ohio (14/121): Aaron Baddeley, Luke Donald, Jason Dufner, Ryan Fox, Luke Guthrie, Chesson Hadley, Anirban Lahiri, Lee Kyoung-hoon, Collin Morikawa, Rory Sabbatini, Sam Saunders, Erik van Rooyen, Jhonattan Vegas, Brandon Wu (a)
 Springfield, Ohio (5/73): Zac Blair, Brett Drewitt (L), Nick Hardy (L), Chip McDaniel (L), Brian Stuard
 Dallas, Texas (10/102): Charlie Danielson (L), Brian Davis, Austin Eckroat (a), Julián Etulain, Matt Jones, Carlos Ortiz, Scottie Scheffler, Nick Taylor, Brendon Todd, Mike Weir
 Walla Walla, Washington (3/55): Eric Dietrich (L), Matthew Naumec (L), Spencer Tibbits (a,L)
(a) denotes amateur
(L) denotes player advanced through local qualifying

Alternates who gained entry:
Cody Gribble (Texas) – spot reallocated from England qualifier
Chan Kim (Japan) – spot reallocated from England qualifier
Joel Dahmen (Columbus) – claimed spot held for category 9 or 14
Harris English (Ontario) – claimed spot held for category 9 or 14
Bernd Wiesberger (England) – claimed spot held for category 9 or 14

Nationalities in the field

Weather
Thursday: Partly cloudy, with a high of 67 °F/19 °C. Wind W 11 mph.
Friday: Mostly overcast, with a high of 61 °F/16 °C. Wind W 6-12 mph.
Saturday: Overcast, with a high of 59 °F/15 °C. WNW wind 5-10 mph, with gusts to 15 mph.
Sunday: Partly cloudy. High of 61 °F/16 °C. Wind W 7-14 mph.

Round summaries

First round
Thursday, June 13, 2019

2013 champion Justin Rose birdied his final three holes to shoot 65 (−6), equaling the record for lowest round shot in a U.S. Open at Pebble Beach, and taking a one-shot lead. Xander Schauffele eagled the 18th hole to join Rickie Fowler, Louis Oosthuizen and Aaron Wise in a tie for second. Two-time defending champion Brooks Koepka birdied four of his first six holes before falling back to two-under and a tie for 16th. Seventeen eagles were made during the round, a new U.S. Open record.

Second round
Friday, June 14, 2019

Gary Woodland holed a 50-foot birdie putt on the 9th hole, the last of his round, to post a bogey-free round of 65 (−6) and take a two-shot lead. His 36-hole score of nine-under ties Gil Morgan in 1992 for lowest in a U.S. Open at Pebble Beach. First-round leader Justin Rose was in second place after a round of 70 (−1). Louis Oosthuizen was tied for the lead but had just one par on his back-nine, making four birdies and four bogeys to finish three shots behind. Rory McIlroy got to within a shot of the lead before a bogey at the 13th and double bogey at the par-5 14th, falling into a tie for fourth place and four behind. Brooks Koepka became the first defending champion since 1988 to begin his title defense with two sub-70 rounds and was part of a group tied for sixth, five behind.

Amateurs: Wu (−2), Eaton (E), Hovland (E), Thorbjornsen (+2), Tibbits (+3), Rebula (+4), Eckroat (+5), Yu (+5), Hagestad (+7), Hillier (+7), O'Connell (+8), Parziale (+9), Young (+9), Norton (+13), Bling (+20)

Third round
Saturday, June 15, 2019

Gary Woodland, the 36-hole leader, was two-under par through 11 holes before finding trouble on the par-3 12th, hitting his tee shot into the rough. Still, off the green after his second shot, he made a 33-foot chip shot to save par. At the par-5 14th, his fourth shot almost rolled back down off the green but managed to stop just short. He then made a 42-foot putt to save par yet again. He parred the last four holes to shoot 69 (−2) and take a one-shot lead into the final round. Justin Rose got up-and-down from a greenside bunker for birdie at the par-5 18th to get to 10-under, a shot behind Woodland.

Louis Oosthuizen birdied three holes in a row from the 15th to the 17th to get into a tie for third with Chez Reavie and two-time defending champion Brooks Koepka, four shots behind. Koepka didn't make a bogey in a round of 68 (−3).

Amateurs: Wu (−2), Hovland (E), Eaton (+2), Thorbjornsen (+15)

Final round
Sunday, June 16, 2019

Summary
Gary Woodland, who came into the final round with a one-shot lead, birdied two of his first three holes and, despite a bogey at the 9th, still led by two making the turn. Brooks Koepka was four-under through five holes but failed to birdie the par-5 6th from a greenside bunker and missed a six-foot putt for birdie at the 7th to trail by two going to the back-nine. At the par-5 14th hole, Woodland went for the green from 264 yards out, his 3-wood just clearing the bunker in front of the green and settling on the hill to the left of the green where he was able to make birdie. Koepka, meanwhile, failed to birdie the same hole after driving into the rough and hitting his third shot onto the same hill.

Still leading by two heading to the par-3 17th, Woodland's tee shot finished on the fringe, 90 feet away from the hole. Forced to chip because of the mound dividing the green, he got his second shot to within 3 feet to save par. Koepka's approach at the par-5 18th went over the green where he failed to get up-and-down for birdie, missing a 9-foot putt to finish at 10-under. Now needing only a bogey at the last to win, Woodland hit an iron off the tee and laid up with his second shot. His third found the green 30 feet to the right of the flag, and he made the putt to shoot a final-round 69 (−2) and finish three shots ahead of Koepka at 13-under.

Justin Rose, one back at the start of the round, played his final 11 holes in 4-over and fell back to a tie for third place with Jon Rahm, Chez Reavie, and Xander Schauffele. Amateur Viktor Hovland finished at 4-under 280, breaking Jack Nicklaus's record for lowest score by an amateur in the U.S. Open; he finished tied for 12th, which was the best by an amateur since Jim Simons tied for 5th in 1971.

Final leaderboard

Scorecard
Final round

Cumulative tournament scores, relative to par
{|class="wikitable" span = 50 style="font-size:85%;
|-
|  style="background:Red;  width:10px;"|
|Eagle
|  style="background:Pink; width:10px;"|
|Birdie
|  style="background:PaleGreen; width:10px;"|
|Bogey
|    style="background:Green; width:10px;"|
|Double bogey
|}

Media
This was the fifth U.S. Open televised by Fox and FS1. During Fox's primetime window in the first round, FS1 offered coverage hosted by Justin Kutcher following the group of Justin Rose, Jordan Spieth and Tiger Woods, and the group of Viktor Hovland, 2018 champion Brooks Koepka, and Francesco Molinari. Due to commitments to baseball and the 2019 FIFA Women's World Cup, there were no plans for similar coverage on FS1 during the remainder of the tournament.

References

External links

United States Golf Association
Coverage on the PGA Tour's official site
Coverage on the European Tour's official site
Coverage on the PGA of America's official site

U.S. Open (golf)
Golf in California
U.S. Open
U.S. Open (golf)
U.S. Open
U.S. Open